The Second Wind is a 2007 French crime film directed by Alain Corneau and starring Daniel Auteuil and Monica Bellucci. It is a remake of the 1966 film Le Deuxième Souffle.

Cast 
 Daniel Auteuil - Gustave 'Gu' Minda
 Monica Bellucci - Simona - dite 'Manouche'
 Michel Blanc - Commissaire Blot
 Jacques Dutronc - Stanislas Orloff
 Eric Cantona - Alban
 Daniel Duval - Venture Ricci
 Gilbert Melki - Jo Ricci
 Nicolas Duvauchelle - Antoine
 Jacques Bonnaffé - Pascal
 Philippe Nahon - Commissaire Fardiano
 Jean-Paul Bonnaire - Théo, le passeur
 Jean-Claude Dauphin - le notaire
 Francis Renaud - Letourneur

See also 
 Le deuxième souffle (1966)

References

External links 

2000s crime films
French crime drama films
Remakes of French films
2000s French films